Hendricks Chapel is an interfaith religious and cultural chapel located on the campus of Syracuse University in Syracuse, New York. It located on the Shaw Quadrangle, and serves as the spiritual center of Syracuse University by hosting over ten chaplaincies. The Chapel was funded by a bequest from Francis Hendricks, a former Syracuse mayor, long-time trustee of the university, and the chapel's namesake, in honor of his wife, Eliza Jane Hendricks. The Octagonal, domed brick chapel is built in Georgian Colonial style and is characterized by classical portico supported by columns.

Hendricks Chapel was added to the National Register of Historic Places as part of the  Comstock Tract buildings in 1980 The Chapel continues to be a notable center of spiritual and cultural diversity and serves as a place where people can gather for religious, social, cultural, and intellectual purposes, while maintaining its ambiance of sanctuary and its lack of specific religious symbols.

History
The chapel was built with funds donated by New York State Senator Francis Hendricks, who was mayor of Syracuse from 1880 to 1881 and state senator. He was a Syracuse University trustee from 1895 until his death in 1920, and Forestry College trustee from 1913 to 1920. Senator Hendricks, towards the end of his life, used to spend summers near Williamstown, Massachusetts where he and his niece, Kathryn Hendricks, would often visit the chapel at Williams College. During one of these quiet visits, he decided to provide a chapel at Syracuse University, which he envisioned to be the heart of the campus. He gave the university $600,000 – an amount equivalent to about $8.1 million in 2023 – just before his death in June 1920 at age 86. Despite the challenges posed by the Wall Street Crash of 1929 and the onset of the Great Depression, the Chapel was completed on time and opened immediately after to the university community.

Construction
Construction of the chapel began in January 1929 and was completed in September 1930. Designed by the New York architectural firm John Russell Pope and Dwight James Baum, the Chapel was designed in a style that draws inspiration from the work of 16th-century Italian architect Palladio and the Roman Pantheon, a place for all the gods. The contract was awarded to the A. E. Stephens Company of Springfield, Massachusetts on November 1928, who built it in Georgia limestone and brick. At the time of its construction, Hendricks was the third largest University chapel in the country, seating 1,450.

The interior of the chapel is decorated with three verses in gilded lettering circle  — two from the Gospel of John and one from 2 Corinthians   – which are the building's only permanent religious symbol. The center aisle is 72-foot in length. 

Miss Kathryn Hendricks, the Senator's niece, was present for the laying of the cornerstone on June 9, 1929 as well as at the dedication ceremony held in June 1930, a month after the building was opened. She also donated the original Aeolian organ during the ceremony held on October 5 & 8, 1930. The pulpit was the gift of the Class of 1918.

Early programming
The chapel was intended to serve people from all faiths and remains a centerpiece of the Syracuse University campus. The chapel was built with the goal of it becoming "the heart of the campus", with the principle of providing a complete religious program for the university's students. The first student services were held on September 21, 1930. The chapel was established with a board made up of both faculty and students, and the program consisted of three phases: worship, religious education, and personal and social relations. The worship program included a regular Sunday service and a daily chapel service, and denominational counselors were provided by several different denominations to work with the chapel staff. According to an article in the New York Times, the Chapel regularly attracted 1,200 student by 1937.

Upgrades
Throughout the years, the Chapel has undergone several changes, including the replacement of the organ in 1952 with a Holtkamp Organ Company organ. In  1969, new office spaces were added at the cost of over $90,000.

In May 1968, what had been formerly called the Colonial room was renamed the Noble room to honor then recently passed dean Charles C. Noble. In 1980, Rena Pierson Dankovich Chapel was donated, along with vestments and religious articles serving the world’s major faiths and in 1985 a five-year interior and exterior restoration effort was completed at the cost of $1.2 million. In 1999, a two-phase renovation began, which included the main office suite and the Noble Room. The Noble Room was equipped with new furnishings, a large screen projection system, internet access, a small stage area with lighting and also now equipped to display works of art.

In 2003, the chapel was upgraded with wireless internet capabilities. The renovation included the upgrade of technology and covered all rooms except the upper balcony.

The chapel underwent a thorough review in 2016, its first in 30 years. In October 2017, the front stairs of Hendricks Chapel were replaced. The then nearly 90-year-old limestone stairs were replaced by granite to preserve the historic look of the limestone while adding more strength. Two stainless steel handrails 5 feet apart were also installed across the steps to bring the stairs up to code.

Chaplaincies
The Chapel is home to ten chaplaincies, including Baptist, Buddhist, Evangelical Christian, Historically Black Churches, Islamic, Jewish, Lutheran, Pagan, Methodist, and Roman Catholic. The Muslim Fellowship was first added in 1957-58, with an Islamic Chaplaincy being added in 1979.

In addition, there are a number of student religious groups, including groups associated with the chaplaincies as well as Adventist, Christian Science, Hindu, Mormon, Muslim, Orthodox Christian, Pentecostal, and more.

List of Deans
The chapel adopted a policy that allowed for the appointment of a Dean who was not necessarily affiliated with the institution's traditional Methodist religious backing. While such policy is in place, the chapel has never been led by a non-Methodist dean.

 William Harrison Powers (Founding dean; 1929–1945)
 Charles Casper Noble (1945–1967) 
 John "Jack" H. McCombe Jr. (1967–1980)  
 Richard L. Phillips (1981–1999) 
 Thomas V. Wolfe (1999–2013) 
 Tiffany L. Steinwert (2010–2015)  
 Brian Konkol (2017– ) 

Konkol was named the seventh dean of the chapel in 2017.

Events & Current use
The Chapel has been a central part of the Syracuse University community since its opening, and has played host to numerous events, including religious services, town hall meetings, memorials ceremonies, concerts, lectures, protests, viral videos, performances, and community gatherings. In May 1970, the chapel was the staging site for about 2,000 Syracuse student striking to protest the U.S. military forces' bombing of Vietnam, and remained open 24 hours daily.

The Chapel celebrated its 75th anniversary in 2005 by hosting a series of events, including a community service symposium, a reception, a history exhibit, tours of the Chapel, and a lecture by a former SU professor. The anniversary celebration also featured a rededication ceremony, during which the Hendricks Chapel Choir debuted a new anthem composed especially for the occasion.

The chapel hosts annual Holidays at Hendricks concert series in December. Some of the performing groups include the University Symphony Orchestra, University Singers, The Hendricks Chapel Choir, Setnor Sonority, Crouse Chorale and the Morton Schiff Jazz Ensemble.

The chapel has hosted speakers from variety of backgrounds including politicians and government officials (Hillary Clinton, Ron Paul, Madeleine Albright), authors (George Saunders, Jelani Cobb Charles Blow & Ross Douthat), academics (David McCullough, Dacher Keltner), and public figures (Al Sharpton, Don McPherson Forest Whitaker, Soledad O’Brien & Wes Craven, Karen Armstrong) among others.

It has served as wedding venue for many connected to the university. The first legal same-sex marriage in the chapel was hosted in May 2012 after it became legal in New York state in 2011.

People's place
People's Place is a non-profit, student-run cafe located in the basement of Hendricks Chapel. Established in 1971, the cafe offers cheap eats and snacks, including coffee, sandwiches, and pastries. The cafe operates independently from the university, offering a unique alternative to mainstream cafes, and all its profits go to Hendricks Chapel. People's Place maintains its independence and provides a relaxed atmosphere for students, while also supporting the mission of the Chapel. People's Place actively participates in issues both on and beyond University Hill, and has been known to close or offer free coffee and baked goods in response to important events on campus. People's Place aims to foster a sense of community for students and faculty members by providing a place to grab a coffee and have a conversation. The cafe underwent renovations to its kitchen and menu in 2019.

Awards
In 2018, the chapel received a prestigious Outstanding Spiritual Initiatives award for promoting spiritual and religious growth on a college campus by the National Association of Student Personnel Administrators.

See also
Archbold Gymnasium
Comstock Tract Buildings
Steele Hall
List of Registered Historic Places in Onondaga County, New York

References

Bibliography

External links

 
 Hendricks Chapel Records

1930 establishments in New York (state)
Churches in Syracuse, New York
Churches completed in 1930
Educational institutions established in 1930
National Register of Historic Places in Syracuse, New York
Syracuse University
Syracuse University buildings
Tourist attractions in New York (state)
United Methodist churches in New York (state)
University and college chapels in the United States
Syracuse